Mauro Alberto Lainez Leyva (born 9 May 1996) is a Mexican professional footballer who plays as a winger for Liga MX club Juárez, on loan from América.

Club career

Pachuca
Lainez was scouted at a young age and joined Pachuca's youth academy in 2011. On 19 August 2015, under manager Diego Alonso, Lainez made his competitive debut with Pachuca in the Copa MX group stage match against Ascenso MX club Venados playing 85 mins in the 4–1 win.

Lobos BUAP
During the 17/18 season, Lainez signed on a loan deal with Lobos BUAP from Pachuca.

International career

Youth
Lainez was included in the roster to be part of the 2015 CONCACAF U-20 Championship. On 8 May 2015, he was also included to form part of the final roster that will participate in the 2015 FIFA U-20 World Cup. In Mexico's third group match against Serbia, Lainez played the last  35 minutes in the team's 2–0 loss.

Lainez was called up by Jaime Lozano to participate with the under-23 team at the 2019 Pan American Games, with Mexico winning the third-place match.

Senior
In September 2020, Lainez received his first senior national team call-up by Gerardo Martino for a training camp.

Lainez received his second call-up to the senior national team, and made his debut on 8 December 2021 in a friendly match against Chile, coming in as a substitute in the 83rd minute for Sebastián Córdova.

Career statistics

Club

International

Personal life
Mauro Lainez has a younger brother called Diego Lainez, who is also a professional footballer. Both brothers started in Pachuca's Youth Academy. However, Mauro's brother decided to leave for América, while Mauro opted to stay at Pachuca.

Honours
Mexico Youth
CONCACAF U-20 Championship: 2015
Pan American Bronze Medal: 2019

References

External links
Mexico U-20
Brothers Diego & Mauro Laínez

1996 births
Living people
Footballers from Tabasco
2015 CONCACAF U-20 Championship players
Mexico international footballers
Mexico under-20 international footballers
C.F. Pachuca players
Club América footballers
Club León footballers
Club Tijuana footballers
FC Juárez footballers
Lobos BUAP footballers
Mineros de Zacatecas players
Liga MX players
Ascenso MX players
Association football wingers
Pan American Games medalists in football
Pan American Games bronze medalists for Mexico
Footballers at the 2019 Pan American Games
Medalists at the 2019 Pan American Games
Mexican footballers